Dolgaya Polyana is a rural locality (a selo) and the administrative center of Dolgopolyanskaya Rural Settlement, Starooskolsky District, Belgorod Oblast, Russia. The population was 470 as of 2010. There are 8 streets.

Geography 
Dolgaya Polyana is located 22 km southwest of Stary Oskol (the district's administrative centre) by road. Prokudino is the nearest rural locality.

References 

Rural localities in Starooskolsky District